Loyola College, Ibadan (LCI) is a Boys only Government-owned College in Oyo State, Nigeria  founded by the Catholic Missionary in 1954. It is located within old Ife road, Agodi area in Ibadan. Since being established, the school has produced luminaries in the fields of medicine, engineering, law, politics, media and other professions.

Notable alumni

Loyola College has produced many notable alumni in different fields, they include:
Lam Adesina Former governor of Oyo State
Oluwarotimi Odunayo Akeredolu a Senior Advocate of Nigeria (SAN) and Executive Governor of Ondo State.
Dele Bakare Software Engineer and Entrepreneur
Raymond Dokpesi Media businessman
Akin Fayomi Diplomat
Oluseun Onigbinde Entrepreneur and open data analyst
Lawson Oyekan Ceramic sculptor
Professor Patrick Utomi Renowned Economist and former Presidential aspirant
Oba Adeyeye Enitan Ogunwusi Traditional Monarch of Ile-ife
Ekpo Una Owo Nta Lawyer and Chairman of the Independent Corrupt Practices and Other Related Offences Commission (ICPC)
Olumide Oyedeji Basketball player who played professionally in the NBA in US and also captained the Nigerian National team (D’Tigers) at the 2012 Olympics

References

External links

Schools in Ibadan
Government schools in Nigeria
Secondary schools in Oyo State
Educational institutions established in 1954
1954 establishments in Nigeria
Boys' schools in Nigeria